John William Boyle, 14th Earl of Cork and 14th Earl of Orrery DSC VRD (12 May 1916 – 14 November 2003), styled The Honourable John Boyle from 1965 to 1995, was an Irish and British peer.

He was educated at Harrow and King's College London, graduating in 1937. He fought in World War II, being mentioned in despatches on two occasions, and was awarded the Distinguished Service Cross. He was married to Mary Gordon-Finlayson, daughter of General Sir Robert Gordon-Finlayson. His eldest son, Jonathan, succeeded him to the Earldom in 2003. John and Mary also had two younger sons: Robert and Reginald.

References

External links

John Boyle, 14th Earl of Cork

1916 births
2003 deaths
People educated at Harrow School
Alumni of King's College London
Recipients of the Distinguished Service Cross (United Kingdom)
John
British people of Irish descent
Royal Naval Volunteer Reserve personnel of World War II
Royal Navy officers of World War II
14th
14th
11th
Cork